Léon-Charles Bienvenu (25 March 1835, in Paris – January 1911, in Paris) was a French journalist and writer known for his biting satires on political and social life during the Second French Empire. He was also known by his pen-name Touchatout.

1835 births
1911 deaths
Writers from Paris
French caricaturists
19th-century French journalists
French male journalists
19th-century French male writers